The 1844 Massachusetts gubernatorial election was held on November 11.

Incumbent Whig Governor George N. Briggs was re-elected to a second term in office over Democrat George Bancroft.

General election

Candidates
George Bancroft, historian and former Collector of the Port of Boston (Democratic)
George N. Briggs, incumbent Governor since January 1844 (Whig)
Samuel Edmund Sewall, attorney and Liberty nominee for Governor since 1842 (Liberty)

Results

See also
 1844 Massachusetts legislature

References

Governor
1844
Massachusetts
November 1844 events